Absolute World is a residential condominium twin tower skyscraper complex in the five-tower Absolute City Centre development in Mississauga, Ontario, Canada. The project was built by Fernbrook Homes and Cityzen Development Group. With the first three towers completed (Absolute City Centre 1 and 2 and Absolute Vision), the last two towers (Absolute World 4 and 5) were topped off at 50 and 56 storeys.

Background
In 2004, an international design competition was held to select the architect for the fourth tower for Absolute World.  Yansong Ma, founder of the MAD office, Beijing/China architectural design firm was announced the winner. Sales were to start in May 2007 with construction beginning later that year, and anticipated completion in 2009. Within days of the announcement, the taller building had been nicknamed the "Marilyn Monroe" tower due to its curvaceous, hourglass figure likened to actress Marilyn Monroe. Burka Varacalli Architects, a Toronto firm, was hired as MAD's local partner in April 2007.

On June 14, 2012, the Chicago-based Council on Tall Buildings and Urban Habitat (CTBUH), a non-profit group of architects and engineers, reported that the towers were among the world's best new skyscrapers. The building would also win the Emporis Skyscraper Award in 2012.

Design

The larger of the two towers twists 209 degrees from the base to the top, making it very similar to Turning Torso in Malmö, Sweden. The structural design was done by Sigmund Soudack & Associates Inc, a Toronto-based structural engineering firm. The tower has six levels of underground parking.

The following table lists the amount of rotation for each floor of Tower 1.

Project Managers
 MAD: Ma Yansong & Dang Qun
 Fernbrook: Anthony Pignetti, Sergio Vacilotto, Ivano DiPietro, Faruq Ahmad, Jordana Scola.

See also
 List of tallest buildings in Mississauga
 List of twisted buildings

References

External links
 Absolute Condos official website
 Skyscrapernews article on the building
 Absolute World images gallery at Urban Toronto

Buildings and structures in Mississauga
Twin towers
Twisted buildings and structures
Residential skyscrapers in Canada
Residential buildings completed in 2012
Residential condominiums in Canada
Ma Yansong buildings
2012 establishments in Ontario